Maklavan-e Pain (also Romanized as Māklavān-e Pā’īn and Māklavān-e Pāeen) was a village in Sardar-e Jangal Rural District, Sardar-e Jangal District, Fuman County, Gilan Province, Iran. At the 2006 census, its population was 894, in 233 families.  It is now part of the city of Maklavan.

References 

Former populated places in Gilan Province
Fuman County